George Packer (born ca. 1960) is a US journalist, novelist, and playwright. He is best known for his writings for The New Yorker and The Atlantic about U.S. foreign policy and for his book The Assassins' Gate: America in Iraq. Packer also wrote The Unwinding: An Inner History of the New America, covering the history of the US from 1978 to 2012. In November 2013, The Unwinding received the National Book Award for Nonfiction. His award-winning biography, Our Man: Richard Holbrooke and the End of the American Century, was released in May 2019. His latest book, Last Best Hope: America in Crisis and Renewal was released in June 2021.

Early life and education 
Packer was born in California around 1960. His parents taught at Stanford University: his mother, Nancy Packer (née Huddleston), was a Wallace Stegner Fellow in the Creative Writing Program and later professor of English, and his father, Herbert L. Packer, was a distinguished professor of law, and the author of numerous books and articles. Packer's maternal grandfather, George Huddleston, Sr., had served eleven successive terms (1915–1937) representing Alabama's 9th congressional district in the U.S. House of Representatives. His uncle, George Huddleston, Jr., succeeded to his father's seat in the House of Representatives from 1954 to 1964. Packer's sister, Ann Packer, also is a writer. Their father's background was Jewish and their mother's Christian. In a 2022 talk for House of SpeakEasy's Seriously Entertaining program, Packer shared that his father took his own life when he (Packer) was twelve years old, calling it "the big event of my childhood."

Packer graduated from Yale College in 1982, where he resided at Calhoun College (now called Grace Hopper College). He served in the Peace Corps in Togo.

Packer is married to writer and editor Laura Secor. He was previously married to Michele Millon.

Career
His essays and articles have appeared in Boston Review, The Nation, World Affairs, Harper's, The New York Times, and The New Yorker, among other publications. Packer was a columnist for Mother Jones and was a staff writer for The New Yorker from 2003 to 2018. He now writes for The Atlantic.

Packer was a Holtzbrinck Fellow Class of Fall 2009 at the American Academy in Berlin.

His 2005 book The Assassins' Gate: America in Iraq analyzes the events that led to the 2003 invasion of Iraq and reports on subsequent developments in that country, largely based on interviews with ordinary Iraqis. He was a supporter of the Iraq war. He was a finalist for the 2004 Michael Kelly Award.

In July 2013 the New Yorker Festival released a video entitled Geoffrey Canada on Giving Voice to the Have-nots, of a panel that was moderated by George Packer. Along with Canada, the panelists included Abhijit Banerjee, Katherine Boo, and Jose Antonio Vargas.

The Unwinding: An Inner History of the New America focuses on the ways that America changed in the years between 1978 and 2012. The book achieves this mainly by tracing the lives of various individuals from different backgrounds through the years. Interspersed are capsule biographies of influential figures of the time such as Colin Powell, Newt Gingrich, Elizabeth Warren, Jay-Z, and Raymond Carver.

In 2019, Packer released a book titled Our Man: Richard Holbrooke and the End of the American Century. It's a full-scale scholarly biography of Richard Holbrooke, one of the most influential U.S. diplomats of the late 20th Century.

His 2021 book Last Best Hope: America in Crisis and Renewal describes the fragmentation of American society in recent decades into four mutually antagonistic "four Americas": "Free America" (economically liberal), "Smart America" (educated, affluent and socially liberal), "Real America" (white rural precariat) and "Just America" (urban, progressive and economically disadvantaged).

Awards and honors

2005 Cornelius Ryan Award, The Assassin's Gate
2013 National Book Award for Nonfiction, The Unwinding
2013 National Book Critics Circle Award (Nonfiction) shortlist for The Unwinding
2017 Whiting Creative Nonfiction Grant to complete Richard Holbrooke and the End of the American Century
2019 Hitchens Prize  Our Man: Richard Holbrooke and the End of the American Century
2019 Los Angeles Times Book Prize (biography) for Our Man: Richard Holbrooke and the End of the American Century
2019 Pulitzer Prize finalist for Our Man: Richard Holbrooke and the End of the American Century

Bibliography

References

External links

George Packer articles at The New Yorker
George Packer articles at Foreign Affairs
George Packer articles at The New York Times

1960 births
20th-century American novelists
21st-century American novelists
American male journalists
American male novelists
Jewish American dramatists and playwrights
Living people
The New Yorker staff writers
Peace Corps volunteers
Writers from California
Yale College alumni
20th-century American dramatists and playwrights
American male essayists
American male dramatists and playwrights
20th-century American essayists
21st-century American essayists
20th-century American male writers
21st-century American male writers
The Atlantic (magazine) people
21st-century American Jews